Josh Treacy (born 4 August 2002) is an Australian rules footballer who plays for the Fremantle Football Club in the Australian Football League (AFL).

Early life

Treacy is from Cohuna, a dairy farming area in the north of Victoria. He participated in the Auskick program at Cohuna and played for the Cohuna Kangas in the Central Murray Football and Netball League and the Bendigo Pioneers in the NAB League Boys Under 18s competition. In 2020, Treacy was named to co-captain the Pioneers, but the season was cancelled due to the effects of the COVID-19 pandemic.

AFL career

He was recruited by Fremantle with their first selection, 7th overall, in the 2021 rookie draft. He played for Fremantle's reserves team, Peel Thunder, in the West Australian Football League (WAFL) during the pre-season, and was suspended for two games for striking former Fremantle player Brady Grey during one of the games. Due to a misalignment of the WAFL and AFL season, the two week suspension was initially thought to be effectively four weeks, until the AFL made a ruling that the suspension to play for Fremantle for shall be considered as two weeks of the AFL season, not the WAFL season. Treacy made his AFL debut during the fourth round of the 2021 AFL season in Fremantle's clash against .

Statistics
 Statistics are correct to the end of round 10, 2022

|- style="background-color: #EAEAEA"
! scope="row" style="text-align:center" | 2021
|
| 35 || 15 || 13 || 10 || 70 || 45 || 115 || 51 || 31 || 0.9 || 0.7 || 4.7 || 3.0 || 7.7 || 3.4 || 2.1
|-
! scope="row" style="text-align:center" | 2022
|
| 35 || 4 || 1 || 2 || 19 || 12 || 31 || 10 || 9 || 0.3 || 0.5 || 4.8 || 3.0 || 7.8 || 2.5 || 2.3
|- class="sortbottom"
! colspan=3| Career
! 19
! 14
! 12
! 89
! 57
! 146
! 61
! 40
! 0.7
! 0.6
! 4.7
! 3.0
! 7.7
! 3.2
! 2.1
|}

Notes

References

External links

2002 births
Living people
Fremantle Football Club players
Bendigo Pioneers players
Australian rules footballers from Victoria (Australia)
Peel Thunder Football Club players